WLCU (88.7 FM) is a Christian radio and College radio–formatted  radio station licensed to Campbellsville, Kentucky, United States.  The station is locally–owned by Campbellsville University in conjunction with low-power television station WLCU-CD (channel 15).

History
The construction permit for WLCU was given in 2007. However, it would not be until 2011 that the station went on-the-air.

References

External links
WLCU's official website

LCU
LCU